is a Japanese manga created by author Yuki Suetsugu.

Story

Midori Wakatsuki is a beautiful but introverted girl who simply cannot connect with her peers and wants to run away from home. The reason for her unsociability is that after her parents' death, she was placed in an abusive foster family where she was sexually assaulted by her adopted brother. When her real brother, Tokio, comes back from the States and demands custody, Midori's life changes forever.

Plagiarism
In October 2005, Suetsugu was accused of plagiarising Takehiko Inoue's Slam Dunk and Real. Kodansha confirmed many of the allegations and the author herself admitted to some. Due to this, Kodansha ceased publications of all of Suetsugu's work. Tokyopop cancelled their English release on the request from Kodansha before the first volume was released and German publisher Heyne Verlag cancelled its release after the 7th volume.

References

2000 manga
Drama anime and manga
Shōjo manga
Comics involved in plagiarism controversies